Kawango Agot is a Kenyan professor at the University of Nairobi. Agot's research focuses on HIV, HIV transmission, and male circumcision. She is the Project Coordinator of a joint research project between her university and the universities of  Illinois and Manitoba (UNIM), evaluating the effect of male circumcision among HIV in young men.

She is an HIV specialist.

A Fulbright scholar, she earned her bachelor's degree from the University of Nairobi, a Master of Philosophy from Moi University, and a PhD and MPH at the University of Washington.

References

External links 
 Kawango Agot, Fulbright New Century Scholars Program.

Living people
Year of birth missing (living people)
Fellows of the African Academy of Sciences
Moi University alumni
University of Nairobi alumni
University of Washington School of Public Health alumni
HIV/AIDS researchers
Kenyan venereologists
Fulbright alumni